Kalagunan is a village on the west coast of New Ireland, Papua New Guinea. There is a point here known as Kalagunan Point It is located in Sentral Niu Ailan Rural LLG.

References

Populated places in New Ireland Province